Qiubei County is under the administration of the Wenshan Zhuang and Miao Autonomous Prefecture, in southeast Yunnan province, China.

Administrative divisions
In the present, Qiubei County has 3 towns, 4 townships and 5 ethnic townships. 
3 towns
 Jinping
 Yuezhe
 Shuanglongying
4 townships

5 ethnic townships

Ethnic groups
The Qiubei County Gazetteer 丘北县志 (1999) lists the following ethnic subgroups.

Han
Zhuang
Miao
Green Miao 青苗 (autonym: Mengshi 蒙史)
White Miao 白苗 (autonym: Mengdou 蒙斗)
Flowery Miao 花苗 (autonym: Mengzhua 蒙爪)
Yao
Landian Yao 蓝靛瑶
Daban Yao 大板瑶
Guoshan Yao 过山瑶
Yi
Naisoupo 乃叟泼 (Black Yi 黑彝)
Guopo 锅泼 or Boren 僰人 (White Yi 白彝)
Sanipo 撒尼泼 (Sani 撒尼): in Badaoshao 八道哨, Shuanglongying 双龙营, and Yuezhe 曰者 (Wenshan Prefecture Ethnic Gazetteer 2005:352)
Poulongpo 剖笼泼 (Pula 仆拉)
Boren 僰人: in Shede 舍得 (in Bainitang 白泥塘), Yuezhe 曰者, Guanzhai 官寨, Shuanglongying 双龙营 (in Liuwanpo 六湾坡); also in Zhetai 者太 and Zhetu 者兔 of Guangnan County (Wenshan Prefecture Ethnic Gazetteer 2005:353); Luozidi 倮子地 and Dazhuqing Xinzhai 大竹箐新寨 of Shupi Township 树皮乡.
Bai: in Mazhelong 马者龙, Buyi 布宜, Yayize 丫以则 (Upper and Lower 上下), Anuo 阿诺, Longga 龙嘎/戛, Yuezhe 曰者, Jiucheng 旧城; also in the townships of Shuanglongying 双龙营, Badaoshao 八道哨, Jinping 锦屏, Yuezhe 曰者, and Shupi 树皮; Jiayi 稼依镇 of Yanshan County (Wenshan Prefecture Ethnic Gazetteer 2005:172, 353)
Hui: in Yuezhe 曰者 and Jinping 锦屏; also in Zhulin 珠琳 and Liancheng 莲城 of Guangnan County; Yanshan; Wenshan County

Transport
Nearest airport: Wenshan Airport
Qiubei Tram

Climate

See also
 Hanging coffins

References

External links

Qiubei County Official Website

County-level divisions of Wenshan Prefecture